Sherkate Khalkhal Dasht Football Club is an Iranian football club based in Khalkhal, Iran. They currently compete in the Iran Football's 2nd Division.

Season-by-Season 
The table below shows the achievements of the club in various competitions.

See also 
 Hazfi Cup
 Iran Football's 3rd Division 2011–12

References 

Football clubs in Iran
Association football clubs established in 2009
Khalkhal County